Goniobranchus albopustulosus is a species of colourful sea slug, a dorid nudibranch, a marine gastropod mollusc in the family Chromodorididae.

Distribution
This marine species was described from Hawaii. It has been reported from the Marshall Islands and Kure Atoll.

References

Chromodorididae
Gastropods described in 1860
Taxa named by William Harper Pease